MDP may refer to:

Medicine and psychology
MDP syndrome, a rare genetic disorder
Manic depressive psychosis, also known as bipolar disorder
Mesolimbic dopamine pathway of the brain
Methylene diphosphonate, a pharmaceutical product used especially in nuclear medicine
Muramyl dipeptide, a component of bacterial cell walls with inflammatory properties
10-Methacryloyloxydecyl dihydrogen phosphate, an adhesive monomer for dental adhesive materials
A brand name for the medication medronic acid
Monocyte Dendritic-cell Progenitors, a type of progenitor cell

Organizations
Madison Dearborn Partners, an American private equity firm
Malaysian Democratic Party, a Malaysian political party
Maldivian Democratic Party, a Maldivian political party
Maendeleo Democratic Party, a Kenyan political party
Maryland Department of Planning, a state agency of Maryland
Michigan Democratic Party, an American political party
Microbicides Development Programme, a British organization that studies microbicides
Ministry of Defence Police, a British civilian police force
Montana Democratic Party, an American political party
Movement for Democracy and Progress (Comoros), a politic party in the Comoros
Movement for Democracy and Progress (Republic of the Congo), a political party in the Republic of the Congo
Democratic Party (South Korea, 2000), formerly known as the Millennium Democratic Party
Hungarian Working People's Party, the ruling communist party in Hungary between 1949 and 1956
Meredith Corporation (NYSE: MDP), an American media conglomerate
Nationalist Democracy Party, a Turkish political party
Portuguese Democratic Movement
Article 1 – Democratic and Progressive Movement (Italian: Articolo 1 – Movimento Democratico e Progressista), an Italian political party

Science and engineering
 Minimum Desirable Product, a product with enough features to be desirable for most customers (a stage that follows MVP)
Markov decision process, a probabilistic model that is widely used in artificial intelligence
Mask data preparation, a process in electronic design automation
Media Dispatch Protocol, a file transfer protocol
Membrane dipeptidase, an enzyme
Mini DisplayPort, a digital display interface

Other uses
Manic Depressive Psychosis (band), an Armenian metal band
Management Development Programme, a middle-management form of MBA
Mbala language (ISO 639 code: mdp), a Bantu language